Yethadka is a hamlet in the Kumbadaje village of Kasaragod district, Kerala State of India.

Education
School: AUP School Yethadka (Aided Upper Primary School, Yethadka).

Landmarks
Post Office:  Yethadka has a branch post office and pin code is 671551.

References 

Suburbs of Kasaragod